David Lodge (born April 1, 1957) is an American biologist. He is best known for his work on the interrelated problems of invasive species, land use, and climate change, and their synergistic impacts on water resources.

Biography 
Lodge is a 1975 graduate of Sewanee Academy (now St. Andrew's-Sewanee School) and received his B.S., summa cum laude, in 1979 from Sewanee: The University of the South. As a Rhodes Scholar, he completed his D.Phil. from Oxford University in 1982. From 1983-1985, he taught at the University of Wisconsin–Madison. From 1985-2016, he served on the faculty of the University of Notre Dame as a professor of biology, the director of the Notre Dame Center for Aquatic Conservation, and the director of the Notre Dame Environmental Change Initiative. From 2011-2016, Lodge was the  Ludmilla F., Stephen J., and Robert T. Galla Professor of Biological Sciences. Since May 2016, Lodge has been a member of the faculty of Cornell University where he holds the Francis J. DiSalvo Directorship of the David R. Atkinson Center for a Sustainable Future.

Lodge is a fellow of the American Association for the Advancement of Science and of the Ecological Society of America. He advocates for scientific approaches to manage invasive species in lake ecosystems. In 2014, Lodge served as a Jefferson Science fellow in the Office of Ocean and Polar Affairs at the United States Department of State.

References

External links 
Google Scholar

1957 births
Living people
Scientists from Ithaca, New York
Alumni of the University of Oxford
University of Notre Dame faculty
Cornell University faculty
University of Wisconsin–Madison faculty
American Rhodes Scholars
Jefferson Science Fellows
21st-century American biologists
Fellows of the Ecological Society of America
American limnologists
Scientists at University of Notre Dame Environmental Research Center